Amadou Jean Tigana (born 23 June 1955) is a French former footballer and coach. He has played in midfield and managed professional football extensively throughout France, including 52 appearances and one goal for the France national football team during the 1980s. He most recently coached Chinese Super League outfit Shanghai Shenhua. In his prime, he was a tireless central midfielder, renowned as one of the best midfielders in the world during the 1980s.

Club career
Tigana started his professional career as a player at Toulon, having been spotted fairly late playing part-time while employed in a spaghetti factory and then as a postman. He moved to Lyon in 1978 and then to Bordeaux in a $4 million transfer. In Bordeaux's midfield for eight years, Tigana helped them to three league titles and three French cups, as well as taking them close to European glory on two occasions, losing in the semi-final of the European Cup and Cup Winners' Cup in 1985 and 1987 respectively.

He moved in 1989 to Olympique Marseille, and ended his career there following the 1990–91 season, winning two consecutive league titles, and reaching the European Cup Final during the latter season, only to be defeated by Red Star Belgrade on penalties following a 0–0 draw.

International career
Tigana was born in Bamako, French Sudan (now Mali) to a Malian father and a French mother. He represented France, and as an international Tigana joined Michel Platini, Luis Fernandez and Alain Giresse in what was termed "the Magic Square" (le Carré Magique) – one of the greatest midfield foursomes of all time. He was part of the France national football team that won UEFA Euro 1984 on home soil, defeating Spain in the final. Tigana's single international goal came against Hungary in the 1986 FIFA World Cup finals, in which France managed a third-place finish.

Playing style
Tigana was a world-class box-to box midfielder, who usually played in the centre, and who was noted for his great movement, teamwork, pace and tireless stamina. Although Tigana was mainly responsible for his team's defensive duties, he also often ventured forward to create scoring opportunities for his teammates. His work ethic and expansive range of passing, from both long and short range, made him an excellent distributor which, when combined with his close control and simplistic yet efficient dribbling technique, made him a world–class midfielder. He was also well known for his contributions in the more advanced areas of the pitch, due to his ability to spot and execute defense splitting passes.

Managerial career
For his first managerial role, Tigana returned to Lyon, coaching them from 1993 to 1995, before moving on to AS Monaco, where he remained until 1999. They were French league champions in 1997 and Champions League semi-finalists a year later, beating Manchester United in the quarter-finals.

He took over as manager of English club Fulham in April 2000 and helped them to promotion from the Division One to the FA Premier League as champions in his first full season. They finished 13th in their first top flight season for more than 30 years and qualified for the UEFA Cup (via the Intertoto Cup), but was sacked in April 2003, even though Fulham weren't in danger of going down at this stage. The club later took him to court, claiming he had wrongly overpaid for certain players such as Steve Marlet, but the charges were dropped. Tigana then took Fulham to court for wrongful dismissal and won, winning a payout of over £2 million.

In October 2005, after a two years plus game hiatus, he signed a two and a half-year contract with Turkish side Beşiktaş. During that same season, Beşiktaş won the Turkish Cup following an eight years hiatus.

Immediately after winning the 2007 Turkish Cup, Tigana announced that he was to leave Beşiktaş at the end of the season. He left Beşiktaş with two games to play, after a contract termination agreement with club board.

On 25 May 2010, Tigana returned to Ligue 1 coaching joining Bordeaux, replacing Laurent Blanc.

On 7 May 2011, after a severe defeat against Sochaux (0–4) and a verbal aggression from Bordeaux team fans against his daughter, who was in the stadium, he announced that he was to leave the Girondins de Bordeaux.

On 18 December 2011, it was announced that Tigana would coach Shanghai Shenhua from the 2012 season. On 15 April 2012, Tigana resigned as manager of Shanghai Shenhua after a run of poor form leaving the Chinese club in the bottom five of its domestic league.

Career statistics

Club

International

Managerial record

Honours

Player

Club
Bordeaux
Division 1: 1983–84, 1984–85, 1986–87
Coupe de France: 1985–86, 1986–87

Marseille
Division 1: 1989–90, 1990–91

International
France
UEFA European Championship: 1984
FIFA World Cup third place: 1986

Individual
Division 1 Rookie of the Year: 1980
French Player of the Year: 1984
Onze d'Argent: 1984
Ballon d'Or runner-up: 1984
UEFA European Championship Team of the Tournament: 1984
FIFA World Cup All-Star Team: 1986
Onze de Bronze: 1987

Manager

Club
Monaco
Division 1: 1996–97
Trophée des Champions: 1997

Fulham
Football League First Division: 2000–01
UEFA Intertoto Cup: 2002

Beşiktaş
Turkish Cup: 2005–06, 2006–07
Turkish Super Cup: 2006

Individual
French Division 1 Manager of the Year: 1997
French Manager of the Year: 1997

References

External links

 
 FFF.fr profile

1955 births
Living people
Sportspeople from Bamako
French footballers
French football managers
France international footballers
Malian footballers
French people of Malian descent
SC Toulon players
Olympique Lyonnais players
FC Girondins de Bordeaux players
Olympique de Marseille players
Olympique Lyonnais managers
Fulham F.C. managers
Beşiktaş J.K. managers
FC Girondins de Bordeaux managers
Ligue 1 players
Ligue 1 managers
Premier League managers
Süper Lig managers
1982 FIFA World Cup players
UEFA Euro 1984 players
1986 FIFA World Cup players
UEFA European Championship-winning players
Association football midfielders
Malian emigrants to France
Expatriate football managers in England
Expatriate football managers in Turkey
Shanghai Shenhua F.C. managers
Expatriate football managers in China
French expatriate football managers
French expatriate sportspeople in England
French expatriate sportspeople in Turkey
French expatriate sportspeople in China
Black French sportspeople
Chinese Super League managers